Cockerington may refer to the following places in the East Lindsey district of Lincolnshire, England:

North Cockerington
South Cockerington